Giovanni Cianfanini (1462–1542) was an Italian painter of the Renaissance, active in Florence. Little biographical information is known, except that he was the son of Benedetto Cianfanini, also a painter. Giovanni appears to have had a short apprenticeship with Sandro Botticelli, then been associated with the studio of Lorenzo di Credi in Florence. He mainly painted history, sacred subjects, and portraits.

References

1462 births
1542 deaths
15th-century Italian painters
Italian male painters
16th-century Italian painters
Painters from Florence
Italian Renaissance painters